Hong Kong competed at the 2014 Winter Olympics in Sochi, Russia from 7 to 23 February 2014. Barton Lui Pan-To is the only athlete to represent the nation, competing in short track speed skating. Three officials will also be a part of the delegation.

Competitors

Short track speed skating 

Hong Kong achieved one quota place. Barton will become the first male athlete to represent Hong Kong at the Winter Olympics.

Barton Lui Pan-To competed in the men's 1500 m heats and finished in 30th place overall (out of 36 athletes), which was not good enough to advance. With a single athlete competing in a single event, Hong Kong did not win a medal at these Games.

References

External links 
 
 

Nations at the 2014 Winter Olympics
2014
Winter Olympics